Gerry McGeough (born 1958, near Dungannon, County Tyrone) is a prominent Irish republican who was a volunteer in the Provisional Irish Republican Army (IRA), a former Sinn Féin activist and editor of the defunct The Hibernian magazine. McGeough broke with Sinn Féin in 2001 and he is now an independent Irish Catholic/nationalist activist. McGeough was set to serve 20 years imprisonment after being found guilty in 2011 for attempted murder, although he was released two years later, on 29 January 2013, under the Good Friday Agreement.

Early life
McGeough joined the Provisional IRA East Tyrone Brigade in 1975, aged 16. According to Tim Pat Coogan, Gerry McGeough was beaten by RUC interrogators at Cookstown barracks, Co. Tyrone in 1977, and was deported from Britain following a brief visit to London in 1978. McGeough had been arrested and interrogated for a full week before deportation, on suspicion that he was an IRA member. After activity in Ireland and Europe, he was arrested (along with another IRA member, Gerry Hanratty) in August 1988 while crossing the Dutch-German border with two AK47 rifles in his car. He was charged with attacks on the British Army of the Rhine and held for four years in a specially-built German detention centre. His trial in Germany was interrupted by extradition to the United States, where he was charged with attempting to buy surface-to-air-missiles in 1983. He served three years of his sentence in US prisons until his release in 1996 whereupon he was deported to the Republic of Ireland.

McGeough led Sinn Féin's opposition to the referendum on the Nice Treaty in the Republic of Ireland. He was also a Sinn Féin national executive (ard-comhairle) member before becoming disgusted with what he perceives as the socially "liberal" views of "nouveau Sinn Féin".

Post-Sinn Féin activism
McGeough is known for his opposition to what he perceives as "liberalism" within contemporary Sinn Féin:

You would never get a leader of Sinn Féin condemning abortion, homosexual "marriage" or anything of that nature. I, as an Irish nationalist and Roman Catholic, never want to see the day when there are abortion clinics in every market town in Ireland. But looking around there is no political grouping willing to take a stance against that.

He accompanied Justin Barrett on a lecture tour of Irish towns in March 2004, in support of Barrett's unsuccessful attempt to become a member of the European Parliament.

In May 2006, McGeough, as editor, and Charles Byrne, a 28-year-old from Drogheda, launched a monthly magazine called The Hibernian, dedicated to "Faith, Family and Country". The magazine had articles espousing the views of Father Denis Fahey and also promoted the Society of St. Pius X.

In 2007, McGeough declared he would be standing for election in the Northern Ireland Assembly elections against Sinn Féin in the Fermanagh and South Tyrone constituency. He put himself forward as a protest against Sinn Féin's vote in January 2007 to support the Police Service of Northern Ireland (PSNI), a key provision of the St Andrews Agreement. He polled 1.8% of the vote.

The Hibernian ceased publication in 2008.

In the same period, McGeough became associated with the Ancient Order of Hibernians, taking control of the organisation's branch in County Tyrone. McGeough was expelled from the Ancient Order of Hibernians in 2019.

Arrest and conviction
On 8 March 2007 McGeough was arrested by the PSNI whilst leaving the election count centre in Omagh. The arrest was in connection with the 1981 shooting of Sammy Brush.  Brush, an off-duty member of the Ulster Defence Regiment, was delivering mail in his job as a postman near Aughnacloy when he was shot. Brush, who was armed and wearing a bullet-proof vest, managed to return fire in the incident and shot his assailant who fled. McGeough and Vincent McAnespie were charged with attempted murder, conspiracy to murder and possession of firearms with intent to endanger life. Both men were remanded in custody to appear at Dungannon Magistrates' Court on 4 April 2007. McGeough was granted bail on 29 March. Gerry McGeough's lawyers have published a document they claim is proof that a Royal Pardon was given to another alleged IRA member, and questioned why McGeough was not treated similarly. The Northern Ireland Office has stated that it is instead Prerogative of Mercy that was applied to a small number of cases under the Early Release Scheme to resolve technical anomalies.

McGeogh was convicted in February 2011 of attempted murder, possessing firearms with intent, and IRA membership. He was sentenced in April 2011 to 20 years imprisonment, although under the Good Friday Agreement he served less than two years in jail, and was finally released on 29 January 2013.

McAnespie was acquitted of all charges against him.

Comments on the judiciary
On 8 August 2016 McGeough was reported as saying that 'Catholics serving as judges and prosecutors in the Northern Ireland legal system are "traitors" who will be dealt with as "collaborators" once the English are removed. The chairman of the Bar Council of Northern Ireland, Gerry McAlinden QC, stated that "An independent, impartial judiciary and independent, impartial prosecuting counsel play a fundamental role in the maintenance of the rule of law and the protection of rights of all citizens in a free and democratic society ... Impartial and dedicated judges and prosecutors uphold the law and provide justice for victims and the community, and they should be allowed to work without fear or threat. Any attempt to intimidate members of the judiciary or members of the legal profession engaged in prosecution work is to be deplored by all right thinking members of society."

Education
A teacher by profession, Gerry McGeough has a BA Honours Degree in History from Trinity College Dublin and later earned a postgraduate Higher Diploma in Education from University College Dublin.

Published books
Gerry McGeough is the author of two books, The Ambush and other Stories (1996) and a novel, Defenders (1998). He has also published a number of articles in local history periodicals.

References

External links
Gerry McGeough's blog (inactive since 2007)

1958 births
Irish republicans
Irish people convicted of attempted murder
Living people
People convicted of arms trafficking
People deported from the United States
People from Dungannon
Provisional Irish Republican Army members
Republicans imprisoned during the Northern Ireland conflict
Roman Catholics from Northern Ireland
Sinn Féin politicians
Torture victims
Alumni of Trinity College Dublin
Alumni of University College Dublin